General Daniel may refer to:

Hector Daniel (1898–1953), South African Air Force brigadier general
Junius Daniel (1828–1864), Confederate States Army brigadier general
Richard Daniel (1900–1986), German Wehrmacht major general

See also
Charles Daniell (1827–1889), British Army major general
Jody J. Daniels (fl. 1980s–2020s), U.S. Army lieutenant general
Attorney General Daniel (disambiguation)